István Majoros (born 11 July 1974) is a Hungarian wrestler and Olympic champion in Greco-Roman wrestling.

Career
Majoros competed at the 2004 Summer Olympics in Athens where he received a gold medal in Greco-Roman wrestling, the bantamweight class. For this achievement he was elected Hungarian Sportsman of the Year.

Majoros received a bronze medal at the 2005 FILA Wrestling World Championships.

On December 31 (New Year's Eve), 2006, Majoros made his mixed martial arts debut against Norifumi Yamamoto at K-1 Dynamite in Osaka, Japan and lost via TKO in the 1st round. It was his only MMA bout.

Mixed martial arts career

Mixed martial arts record

|-
|Loss
|align=center|0-1
| Norifumi Yamamoto
|TKO (punches)
|K-1 PREMIUM 2006 Dynamite!!
|
|align=center|1
|align=center|3:46
|Osaka, Japan
|

References

External links
 

1974 births
Living people
Olympic wrestlers of Hungary
Wrestlers at the 2000 Summer Olympics
Hungarian male sport wrestlers
Wrestlers at the 2004 Summer Olympics
Olympic gold medalists for Hungary
Hungarian male mixed martial artists
Featherweight mixed martial artists
Mixed martial artists utilizing Greco-Roman wrestling
Olympic medalists in wrestling
Medalists at the 2004 Summer Olympics
World Wrestling Championships medalists
21st-century Hungarian people